Pseudosphex dycladioides is a moth of the subfamily Arctiinae. It was described by Franciscus J. M. Heylaerts in 1890. It is found in São Paulo, Brazil.

References

Pseudosphex
Moths described in 1890